Tiger 22 Media Corporation is an integrated media agency-based radio network in the Philippines. It is an aggrupation of five-partner radio brands under the Vera family: Jam 88.3, Wave 89.1, Magic 89.9 and its provincial network Magic Nationwide, and 99.5 Play FM.

Background
The aggrupation network started out in the early 2000s as The Radio Partners Inc.

In 2011, the group was later reformed as Tiger 22 Media Corporation, established by Rufia Dorothy Vera as CEO. Tiger 22 Media has been known for its campaign projects for their radio stations such as the Zapped DJ Club portal, the Style Origin fashion series with Ayala Malls, and through on-air promotions with brand and establishment partners.

Since 2017, Tiger 22 Media's partner stations organized One Sound, a live on-air concert event series on radio featuring OPM artists.

Stations
The following is a list of radio stations owned and affiliated by Tiger 22 Media.

Note: Tiger 22 Media does not have its own station but are counted as owned-and-operated by their partner stations' owners related to the Vera Group. These stations credited their promotion as "part of" (and not "owned by") Tiger 22 Media through live broadcast events (such as the One Sound series), on-air promotional sponsorship, and on through their stations' websites.

References

External links

 
Philippine radio networks
Mass media companies of the Philippines
Companies based in Makati